Wessington is a city on the border between Beadle and Hand counties in South Dakota, United States. The population was 197 at the 2020 census.

The community hosts its annual Fun Days celebration each July.

History
A post office has been in operation in Wessington since 1882. The city took its name from the nearby Wessington Hills.

The early growth of Wessington began because it was a transshipment point for locally produced grains because of the railroad (C. & N.W. Ry. Co.). This allowed local producers lower shipping costs compared to villages further from railroads, encouraging the location of other businesses in the town. Wessington originally was located in Beadle County, and the cohesiveness the community soon led to growth into neighboring Hand County.

In 1918 there was a flourishing natural ice business that provisioned refrigerated freight cars. The cattle industry in the area has increased the market quality of the nation's cattle through improvements in herd management and adaptations to changing consumer demands. Many producers have received national recognition throughout the years.

Geography
Wessington is located at  (44.455536, -98.699256).

Wessington has been assigned the ZIP code 57381 and the FIPS place code 70140.

Demographics

2020 census

2010 census
As of the census of 2010, there were 170 people, 91 households, and 44 families residing in the city. The racial makeup of the city was 98.8% White and 1.2% from two or more races. Hispanic or Latino of any race were 1.2% of the population.

There were 91 households, of which 12.1% had children under the age of 18 living with them, 42.9% were married couples living together, 3.3% had a female householder with no husband present, 2.2% had a male householder with no wife present, and 51.6% were non-families. 47.3% of all households were made up of individuals, and 19.8% had someone living alone who was 65 years of age or older. The average household size was 1.87 and the average family size was 2.64.

The median age in the city was 53.6 years. 12.9% of residents were under the age of 18; 7.8% were between the ages of 18 and 24; 11.2% were from 25 to 44; 37.6% were from 45 to 64; and 30.6% were 65 years of age or older. The gender makeup of the city was 50.0% male and 50.0% female.

2000 census
As of the census of 2000, there were 248 people, 118 households, and 69 families residing in the city. The population density was 660.7 people per square mile (252.0/km2). There were 143 housing units at an average density of 381.0 per square mile (145.3/km2). The racial makeup of the city was 97.98% White, 0.40% African American, 0.40% Native American, and 1.21% from two or more races. Hispanic or Latino of any race were 1.21% of the population.

There were 118 households, out of which 22.9% had children under the age of 18 living with them, 45.8% were married couples living together, 9.3% had a female householder with no husband present, and 41.5% were non-families. 39.0% of all households were made up of individuals, and 25.4% had someone living alone who was 65 years of age or older. The average household size was 2.10 and the average family size was 2.81.

In the city, the population was spread out, with 25.0% under the age of 18, 3.6% from 18 to 24, 23.4% from 25 to 44, 19.8% from 45 to 64, and 28.2% who were 65 years of age or older. The median age was 44 years. For every 100 females, there were 89.3 males. For every 100 females age 18 and over, there were 80.6 males.

The median income for a household in the city was $21,250, and the median income for a family was $35,750. Males had a median income of $26,250 versus $16,964 for females. The per capita income for the city was $13,767. About 7.0% of families and 11.3% of the population were below the poverty line, including 10.0% of those under the age of eighteen and 25.0% of those 65 or over.

See also
 List of cities in South Dakota

References

External links

 

Cities in South Dakota
Cities in Beadle County, South Dakota
Cities in Hand County, South Dakota